Paul Harris (born October 12 1945)  is an American keyboard player and multi-instrumentalist.

Harris appears on several albums of the 1960s, 1970s and 1980s by leading artists such as Stephen Stills, B. B. King, Judy Collins, Grace Slick, Al Kooper, ABBA, Eric Andersen, Rick Derringer, Nick Drake, John Martyn, John Sebastian, John Mellencamp, Joe Walsh, Seals & Crofts, Bob Seger and Dan Fogelberg.  In the 1970s, he was a member of Stephen Stills' band Manassas and later the Souther–Hillman–Furay Band. He currently resides in Florida.

References

External links 
 For a more complete discography

Year of birth missing (living people)
American session musicians
American rock keyboardists
Souther–Hillman–Furay Band members
American rock pianists
American male pianists
21st-century American pianists
21st-century American male musicians
20th-century American keyboardists
20th-century American male musicians